Challenge Stakes may refer to one of several horse races:

 Challenge Stakes (Great Britain), a flat horse race in Great Britain
 Challenge Stakes (ATC), a Thoroughbred horse race  in Australia
 Challenge Stakes (New Zealand), a Thoroughbred horse race in New Zealand, commonly called Tarzino Trophy
 Challenge Stakes (Ireland), a horse race in Ireland